The women's singles competition in figure skating at the 2022 Winter Olympics was held on 15 February (short program) and 17 February (free skating), at the Capital Indoor Stadium in Haidian District of Beijing. Anna Shcherbakova, representing the Russian Olympic Committee, won the event, and her teammate, Alexandra Trusova, the silver medal. Kaori Sakamoto of Japan won bronze. For all, it was their first individual Olympic medals; Sakamoto had earlier won a medal in the team event.

Event summary
All three medalists from the 2018 Olympics either retired from competition (Evgenia Medvedeva, Kaetlyn Osmond) or had taken a prolonged break from the sport without an official retirement announcement (Alina Zagitova). The 2021–22 season was dominated by Russian skaters, who held the six highest scores prior to the Olympics. Of those six, Kamila Valieva, Anna Shcherbakova, and Alexandra Trusova were selected for the Olympics. Kaori Sakamoto in seventh was the highest non-Russian skater on the list. Valieva dominated the Olympic season, winning every competition she entered and with her lowest international score still over 10 points higher than that of any of her competitors. Her undefeated season coupled with her status as the world record holder in all three segments saw her deemed the heavy favorite to win the Olympics prior to her becoming subject to a doping investigation. With Shcherbakova the 2021 World champion and Trusova the 2021 World bronze medalist, predictions considered a sweep by the ROC the most likely scenario.

Valieva won the short program, with Shcherbakova second, Sakamoto third, and Trusova fourth. Trusova won the free skate and became the first woman to land five quadruple jumps in the same program. Valieva and Shcherbakova were the only other competitors to attempt quadruple jumps, and Valieva was the first woman to land a quad at the Olympics just one week earlier, during the team event free skate. Out of her five quads, Trusova landed only two cleanly, with her Quad Flip receiving an edge call. Shcherbakova landed two quadruple jumps, both cleanly. Valieva, skating last, fell twice, made a number of other mistakes, and dropped to fourth place overall.

Doping controversy
On 8 February, a day after the ROC victory in the team event, a positive test result for trimetazidine from the Russian Championships in December for Kamila Valieva of the ROC was released by a Swedish lab, and her participation at the Olympics became subject to a doping investigation. The Court of Arbitration for Sport ruled on 14 February that she would not be provisionally suspended and would be allowed to compete in the individual event as planned, still subject to further and ongoing investigation. The decision from the court was made on three grounds: (1) Due to her age, she is a "Protected Person" as per WADA Code, subject to different rules than adult athletes; (2) Athlete did not test positive during the Olympic Games in Beijing; (3) "There were serious issues of untimely notification of the results, ... which impinged upon the Athlete's ability to establish certain legal requirements for her benefit". In its decision, the CAS stated that preventing "the Athlete from competing at the Olympic Games would cause her irreparable harm in these circumstances". As a result, the IOC decided that, should Valieva win a medal, there would be no flower ceremony or medal ceremony held until the investigation into her doping case is over and there is a concrete decision whether or not to strip her of her medals. To allow for the possibility that her results might be disqualified, the IOC asked the ISU to expand the qualifying field for the free skating by one to 25, contingent upon Valieva being one of the top 24 skaters after the short program.

On 15 February, after the short program, The New York Times reported that Valieva's sample tested positive for an additional two substances, hypoxen and L-Carnitine, which are not on the banned list, in addition to trimetazidine. WADA's filing in Valieva's hearing indicated that her acknowledgement of taking the two permitted substances undercut her testimony that the banned substance was ingested by error. By the end of the Beijing Olympics, a total five athletes were reported for doping violations.

In mid-November, WADA requested that CAS take up the review of the Valieva case with an eye towards a 4-year suspension of Valieva, which would exclude her from competition at the next Winter Olympics, and to rescind her first place performance in the team event at the previous Beijing Olympics because, "the Russian Anti-Doping Agency (RUSADA) did not meet a WADA-imposed Nov. 4 deadline to deliver a verdict on Valieva's case."

Reactions
The CAS decision to allow Valieva to compete despite her positive test drew backlash across the sporting community and in the media, with some questioning as to whether Russia had been adequately punished for their statewide doping program. While the United States Olympic & Paralympic Committee and the Canadian Olympic Committee blasted the decision as a "disappointment" and "extremely unfortunate", the Russian Olympic Committee vowed to take "comprehensive measures" to "keep the honestly won Olympic gold medal [in the team event]". Condemnation of the CAS decision also came from former and current figure skaters alike on social media, although several of Valieva's teammates defended her. Several American skaters noted parallels with the case of U.S. pairs skater Jessica Calalang, who served an eight-month suspension from competition while under investigation for a positive doping test; Calalang was later absolved of any violations after the substance was concluded to be a metabolite of ingredients in her makeup, but she and her partner missed several key competitions during her suspension, including the 2021 World Figure Skating Championships. Some commenting on the situation suggested that blame should not rest with the 15-year-old Valieva, but rather with the Russian system and the coaches and doctors around her. Due to Valieva being a minor, both the World Anti-Doping Agency and the Russian Anti-Doping Agency have launched investigations into her entourage, including coach Eteri Tutberidze and Russian team doctor Filipp Shvetsky. The Russian government and community remained steadfast in their support for Valieva; the Kremlin first referred to the situation as a "misunderstanding", and later issued the following statement: "We boundlessly and fully support Kamila Valieva and call on everyone to support her. And we say to Kamila: don't hide your face. You are a Russian — perform and defeat everybody!"

On 15 February, after the short program, competitors asked about Valieva in the mixed zone largely tried to distance themselves from the situation, indicating that they preferred to focus on their own performances. A few athletes made general references about supporting "clean sport" and a "level playing field". Some expressed regret that no medal ceremony for the team event, and potentially the individual event, would be held; the individual event medal ceremony was eventually held as planned after Valieva placed outside the top three. Valieva herself did not speak with reporters in the mixed zone or attend the press conference for the top three after the short program, where fellow top finishers Anna Shcherbakova and Kaori Sakamoto also declined to comment. IOC spokesman Mark Adams noted that press conferences are not mandatory at the Olympics, and that if Valieva were to medal, they did not expect her to attend that press conference either. Valieva ultimately finished off the podium in fourth; she did not stop in the mixed zone after the free skating.

In a press conference the day after the free skating, IOC president Thomas Bach said he was "very, very disturbed" by the "chilling atmosphere" surrounding Valieva as coach Eteri Tutberidze berated her following a mistake-filled performance that dropped her off the podium. Bach also insinuated that her coaches likely played a role in her positive test, saying that "doping is very rarely done alone with the athletes," and that "the ones who have administered this drug in her body, these are the ones who are guilty." The Kremlin responded that "harshness of a coach in high-level sport is key for their athletes to achieve victories" and that Tutberidze's athletes were seeing strong results. Tutberidze herself claimed to be "at a loss from the assessment of our work by the esteemed Mr Bach" in a comment on an Instagram post by fellow ROC coach Alexander Zhulin. Several Western media outlets pointed to the extreme emotional reactions of the three ROC skaters – Shcherbakova (gold) stated that she felt empty inside, Trusova (silver) was seen shouting that she "hated the sport" and pledged to never skate again, and Valieva (fourth) broke down sobbing – as further evidence of the extreme pressure they were all under to deliver results, as well as the abuse they were subjected to from their team.

By 9 March 2022, Travis Tygart of the USADA reported that Valieva had not requested that her "B" sample be tested, apparently accepting the results of initial testing and relying on her explanation that the banned substance TMZ belonged to her grandfather and only accidentally contaminated or became mixed into her own use of allowed nutrients and supplements. Tygart further stated that as a minor Valieva could still be either fully exculpated or given a warning concerning her testing positive depending on the extent of findings in the on-going RUSADA investigation of doping. According to Tygart, an adverse finding against her as a first offense could still be assessed as a two year suspension, which is half of the suspension time which could be assessed for adults.

Records

Prior to the competition, the existing ISU best scores were:

No new best scores were set during this competition.

Qualification

Schedule

Results

Short program
The short program was held on 15 February.

Free skating
The free skating was held on 17 February.

Overall
The skaters were ranked according to their overall score.

Notes

References

Figure skating at the 2022 Winter Olympics
Women's events at the 2022 Winter Olympics